The Men's 1981 European Amateur Boxing Championships were held in Tampere, Finland from May 2 to May 10, 1981. The 24th edition of the bi-annual competition was organised by the European governing body for amateur boxing, EABA. 171 fighters from 22 European countries participated in the competition.

Medal winners

Medal count table

References

European Amateur Boxing Championships
Boxing
European Amateur Boxing Championships
Sports competitions in Tampere
May 1981 sports events in Europe
International boxing competitions hosted by Finland